Li Fuchao is a Chinese billionaire businessman. In December 2014, Li became a billionaire when the company he chairs and controls, Guilin Fuda automotive, debuted on the Shanghai Stock Exchange. He resides in Beijing, and is divorced.

References

Chinese founders of automobile manufacturers
Chinese billionaires
Living people
Businesspeople from Beijing
Year of birth missing (living people)